Ecaterina Tretiacova (born ) is a Moldovan female weightlifter, competing in the 75 kg category and representing Moldova at international competitions. She competed at European and world championships, including at the 2013 European Weightlifting Championships, 2014 European Weightlifting Championships and 2015 World Weightlifting Championships. She also competed multiple times at the Junior and Youth editions of European and world championships, ranking in top 10.

Major results

References

1996 births
Living people
Moldovan female weightlifters
Place of birth missing (living people)
20th-century Moldovan women
21st-century Moldovan women